Diego Camacho may refer to:
Diego Camacho y Ávila (1652–1712), Spanish archbishop
Diego Camacho (footballer) (born 1976), Spanish footballer
Diego Camacho (tennis) (born 1983), Bolivian tennis player